BC Balkan Botevgrad is a Bulgarian professional basketball club based in Botevgrad. The team is part of NBL and FIBA Europe Cup. The club has also competed in Balkan International Basketball League. They play their home matches at the Arena Botevgrad.

Honours
National Basketball League
Winners (6): 1974, 1987, 1988, 1989, 2019, 2022
Runners-up (5): 1972, 2008, 2015, 2016, 2018
Bulgarian Cup
Winners: (4) 1970, 1986, 1987, 1988
Balkan League
  Third place (1): 2014

Season by season

Current roster

Players

Notable players

References

External links
 Official website
 Club profile at bgbasket.com 
 Club profile at bgbasket.com 

Balkan